Harlee Bashir Laguda Milne (born 3 September 2001), known professionally as SL, is a British rapper.

Early life
Harlee Bashir Laguda Milne was born on 3 September 2001 in Peckham, London, England. He was later raised in Thornton Heath, London during his childhood.

Career
His first single "Gentleman", released in 2017 when he was 15 years old, has been described as a "street anthem", amassing over 76 million views on YouTube, as of March 2023. His next single, "Tropical", peaked on the UK Singles Chart at number 73 in February 2018 and was later certified Platinum by the BPI in 2022. In May, his track "Genes" featuring Chip peaked at number 90. That same month, he was featured on Nines' track "Oh My", which peaked at number 44.

On 15 May 2020, he released a single from his collaboration extended play with American record producer Kenny Beats, titled "Bad Luck", along with its music video. They later released the EP, titled Selhurst SE25 on 4 July 2020, along with a music video for the song "Little Bird" from the project. On 23 October 2020, he released his debut studio album, titled Different Dude.

Musical style and artistry
He is known for his slower "laid back" style of rapping, which has been compared to Giggs.

SL actively wears a ski mask in public, to make his identity anonymous in addition to his persona.

Discography

Extended plays

References

2001 births
People from Croydon
Rappers from London
Living people
English male rappers
Black British male rappers
British trap musicians
UK drill musicians
Gangsta rappers
Masked musicians